"Take It From Me" is a song by the group Commodores. It was released as the second single from their twelfth studio album, United, in 1986 by Polydor Records. It peaked at No. 38 on the Billboard R&B singles chart.

"Take It from Me" was produced by Dennis Lambert, who also composed the song with Franne Golde and Andy Goldmark. "I Wanna Rock You", another song from the album was used as the B-side of the single.

References

1986 songs
1986 singles
Commodores songs
Polydor Records singles
Songs written by Franne Golde
Songs written by Dennis Lambert
Songs written by Andy Goldmark